Simon Philip Nando Collins (born 14 September 1976) is a British-Canadian drummer and the former lead vocalist of the progressive rock band Sound of Contact. Collins is the son of English drummer and singer Phil Collins and Collins' first wife, Andrea Bertorelli. He is the brother of actress Joely Collins and paternal half-brother of actress Lily Collins. Reviewers have compared his vocals to those of his father.

Early life
Collins was born on 14 September 1976 in Hammersmith, London, England. He is the eldest son of English drummer and singer-songwriter Phil Collins and his first wife, British-Canadian citizen Andrea Bertorelli. He moved to Vancouver, British Columbia, in 1984, when he was 8 years old, after his parents' divorce. He lived with his mother, Andrea, and his sister, Joely, in nearby Richmond between the ages of 8 and 11.  In September 1987, they moved into an estate purchased in Vancouver's Shaughnessy neighbourhood with assistance from their father, a decision described by Andrea Collins as a means to a better education for Collins and his sister and for the sake of other lifestyle considerations. In 1991, Simon's parents were involved in a court battle at the Supreme Court of British Columbia to gain possession of the estate, owing to a misunderstanding of the terms of ownership of the home. Their father had previously placed the estate in an irrevocable land trust in 1987, however, to be owned by both children jointly in adulthood. Their father succeeded in retaining control of the estate until Simon's twentieth birthday, as the judge ruled in October 1991 he was not old enough to sign his half of the estate to his mother as she had intended. Collins completed his secondary education at Vancouver's Point Grey Secondary School.

He first became involved with music when he was five after his father purchased for him a Tama drum kit. Collins practised drumming by playing along with music albums in his parents' record collection as well as when accompanying his father while on tour with Genesis. Collins' experiences on tour allowed him to be mentored by his father and by the band's touring drummer, Chester Thompson. Though he had a percussion instructor when he was ten, Collins preferred drumming to artists such as Stewart Copeland, Gavin Harrison, and Keith Moon over his formal lessons in jazz drumming. Simon made his first onstage appearance alongside his father at the age of 12, performing drums on "Easy Lover." He also appeared onstage for a performance during the Seriously, Live! World Tour.

In his early teens, Collins learned to play the piano and began to develop songwriting and singing skills. While he played drums in numerous hard rock bands beginning at age 14, Collins wanted to pursue singing, songwriting, and diversity in music styles, including pop, progressive rock, rock and roll, punk, grunge, and electronica. According to Collins, he did not wish to spend his life "drumming to other people's music." His early compositions were rejected by the heavier rock bands he played for because of their pop style.

In his late teens, Collins worked part-time as a disc jockey in Vancouver's rave scene. His experiences in rave culture inspired a collaborative documentary project with his sister Joely called Summer Love.

Collins developed a passion for astronomy and social issues during his youth, and frequently revisits these themes in his music.

Career

Solo career and collaborations
Prior to the beginning of his solo career, Collins was a member of the local punk band Jet Set. Collins was signed by Warner Music Group following a release of demo tapes he had recorded in 2000. It was at this time that Collins moved from Vancouver to Frankfurt, Germany, where his debut album All of Who You Are was released. The album saw 100,000 copies sold in Germany and three singles were released off it: "Pride", "Money Maker" and "Shine Through". The album's sales have been attributed to the success of the single, "Pride." A second single, "Shine Through", was co-written by Collins and Howard Jones.

In 2003, Collins left Warner Music and returned to Vancouver to start his own record label, Lightyears Music. On the Lightyears label two years later, Collins released his second album, Time for Truth. He played a variety of instruments on the album in addition to providing the majority of the vocals. In 2007, he recorded a cover of Genesis' Abacab track "Keep It Dark," as a tribute to Genesis, with keyboardist and co-producer Dave Kerzner. During production of "Keep it Dark", Collins met Kevin Churko, who mixed and mastered the recording; Collins later had Churko work with him on the production of his third album, U-Catastrophe.

U-Catastrophe, released in 2008 on iTunes, became Collins' first North American recording project. The album's first single, "Unconditional", debuted on the Billboard Hot Adult Contemporary Tracks chart at No. 30 in September 2008. It later peaked at No. 12 on Billboard in November 2008 and charted on the Canadian Hot 100 in the same month. Kerzner, Kelly Nordstrom, and Steve Hackett were featured on "Fast Forward the Future"; Phil Collins appeared on "The Big Bang".

Sound of Contact

In late 2009, Collins approached Kerzner with the idea of forming a new band. After bringing the idea to musicians Matt Dorsey and Kelly Nordstrom, the four of them began working together at Greenhouse Studios in Vancouver. The band, known by December 2012 as Sound of Contact, included Collins on lead vocals and drums, Kerzner on keyboards, Dorsey on bass, and Nordstrom on guitar. The band's debut album, Dimensionaut, was released in May 2013. Soon after the release of Dimensionaut, Nordstrom left the band; Kerzner left in January 2014. Both rejoined the group in April 2015 and, subsequently, Sound of Contact began working on their second album.

Discography

Studio albums
 1999: All of Who You Are
 2005: Time for Truth
 2008: U-Catastrophe
 2020: Becoming Human

Singles

Sound of Contact
2013: Dimensionaut (with Dave Kerzner)

With other artists
 2012: Genesis Revisited II (with Steve Hackett)

References

External links
 
 

Phil Collins
1976 births
Living people
20th-century British pianists
20th-century Canadian drummers
20th-century Canadian pianists
21st-century British pianists
21st-century Canadian drummers
21st-century Canadian pianists
British expatriates in Canada
British expatriates in Germany
British male drummers
British male pianists
British pop pianists
British pop singers
Canadian expatriates in Germany
Canadian male drummers
Canadian male pianists
Canadian people of English descent
Canadian pop pianists
Canadian pop singers
People from Hammersmith